The Apostolic Nunciature to the Sultanate of Oman is the ecclesiastical office of the Catholic Church and the diplomatic post of the Holy See in Oman established in February 2023.

See also

References 

Oman
Catholic Church in Oman
Oman
Oman